Ulatowski is Polish surname. See also:

Rafał Ulatowski, a Polish football manager and former footballer
Tadeusz Ulatowski, a Polish basketball player and coach. 
Krzysztof Ulatowski, a former Polish footballer
Zdzisław Ulatowski, a Polish football coach and former footballer